The Games of Texas are a series of amateur Olympic-style events held each summer and winter in the U.S. state of Texas.  They are organized by the Texas Amateur Athletic Federation (TAAF) and are part of the National Congress of State Games.  Medalists from the Games qualify to participate in the State Games of America, a biennial multi-sport event.

Summer Games
The Summer Games of Texas are held every year across multiple venues in a pre-designated city or region.  The event is usually held in late July and draws more than 10,000 athletes and 15,000–20,000 spectators each year.  It is the largest multi-sport event in Texas.  Each year at the games, TAAF organizes the opening ceremonies, which typically include a parade of athletes and fireworks.  In 2010 and 2011, the event was hosted by Waco, Texas.  In 2012 and 2013, it will be hosted by Corpus Christi, Texas.

Sports contested
Though most "core" sports are held each year at the games, host cities will sometimes add region-specific sports to the games they host.  In 2011, athletes participated in 12 sports:

  Athletics 
  Archery
  Boxing
 Disc Golf
  Fencing
  Golf
 Lifeguarding
  Powerlifting
  Softball 
  Swimming
  Table Tennis
  Tennis

Winter Games
Since their inception in 2006, the Winter Games of Texas have been held in Frisco, Texas.

Sports contested
As of 2011, there are ten sports in which athletes can participate at the winter games:

  Basketball 
  Bowling
  Fencing
  Figure Skating
 Flag Football

 Gymnastics
  Ice Hockey
 Martial Arts
  Swimming
  Table Tennis

References

External links 
 TAAF.com, Official website of the Texas Amateur Athletic Federation
 Official website of TAAF Region 4
 Official website of TAAF Region 7

1986 establishments in Texas
Multi-sport events in the United States
Recurring sporting events established in 1986
Sports competitions in Texas
Under-20 sports competitions
Youth sport in the United States